Hajji Baba Khan (also Romanized as Ḩājjī Bābā Khān; also known as Ḩāj Bābākhān and Ḩājj Bābā Khān) is a village in Qeshlaq-e Sharqi Rural District, Qeshlaq Dasht District, Bileh Savar County, Ardabil Province, Iran. At the 2006 census, its population was 42, in 10 families.

References 

Towns and villages in Bileh Savar County